Jerry Lee Rice Jr. (born July 27, 1991) is an American former professional football player who was a wide receiver. He played college football for the UCLA Bruins and the UNLV Rebels. The Washington Redskins signed him as an undrafted free agent in 2014. Rice is the son of Pro Football Hall of Fame receiver Jerry Rice.

Early life and education
Rice was born in Atherton, California and graduated from Menlo School. He played college football at the University of California, Los Angeles, graduating with a bachelor's degree in June 2013. He decided to forgo his final year of eligibility with the Bruins to earn his master's degree at the University of Nevada, Las Vegas, where he also played football with the Rebels.

Professional career
After his college career, Rice had a try out for the Baltimore Ravens, but wasn't signed. Rice also tried out for the San Francisco 49ers, his father's former team. On June 26, 2014, he signed a contract with the Washington Redskins. On August 1, he suffered a torn labrum in training camp. Two days later, the Redskins waived him with an injury designation. After clearing waivers, he was placed on the Redskins' injured reserve.

On May 4, 2015, he was waived by the Redskins.

On June 15, 2016, Rice was released by the Montreal Alouettes.

Personal life
Rice is the middle of three children and the son of Jerry Rice. He is also the second cousin of Jordan Matthews, who also became an NFL receiver.

References

External links
UNLV Rebels football bio
UCLA Bruins football bio
Montreal Alouettes bio

1991 births
Living people
African-American players of American football
African-American players of Canadian football
American football wide receivers
Canadian football wide receivers
Montreal Alouettes players
People from Atherton, California
Players of American football from California
Sportspeople from the San Francisco Bay Area
UCLA Bruins football players
UNLV Rebels football players
Washington Redskins players